Lafões may refer to the following places in Portugal:

Pinheiro de Lafões, a parish in the municipality of Oliveira de Frades
São Cristóvão de Lafões, a parish in the municipality of Oliveira de Frades 
São Vicente de Lafões, a parish in the municipality of Oliveira de Frades
Souto de Lafões, a parish in the municipality of São Pedro do Sul 

The Duke of Lafões may refer to a former duke title of Portugal